Mount Jefferson is an unincorporated community in Loramie Township, Shelby County, Ohio, United States. It lies along State Route 66 south of Houston.

Mount Jefferson was platted on January 12, 1838, by Jonathan Counts on land owned by Samuel Farnum.  Three churches — Christian, Episcopal, and Presbyterian — were organized in the community, but it never grew significantly; only one store and a few houses were ever built in the community.

References

Populated places established in 1838
Unincorporated communities in Shelby County, Ohio
1838 establishments in Ohio
Unincorporated communities in Ohio